A fourrée is a coin, most often a counterfeit, that is made from a base metal core that has been plated with a precious metal to look like its solid metal counterpart; the term is derived from the French for "stuffed." The term is normally applied to ancient silver-plated coins such as the Roman denarius and Greek drachma, but the term is also applied to other plated coins.

Cicero mentions that M. Marius Gratidianus, a praetor during the 80s BC, was widely praised for developing tests to detect false coins, and removing them from circulation. Gratidianus was killed under Sulla, who introduced his own anti-forgery law (lex Cornelia de falsis), that reintroduced serrated edges on precious metal coins, an anticounterfeiting measure that had been tried earlier.

Serrated denarii, or serrati, which featured about 20 notched chisel marks on the edge of the coin, were produced to demonstrate the integrity of the coin. This effort was in vain, as examples of fourrée serrati attest.

Production

Production of fourrées began almost as early as the production of the first coins in Asia Minor in the 7th century BC. These coins were produced by people wishing to profit by producing a counterfeit containing less precious metal content than its purported face value. The most common method for producing a fourrée was to take a flan of copper, wrap it with silver foil, heat it, and strike it with the dies. If the coin was sufficiently heated and struck hard enough, a layer of eutectic alloy (a mixture of 72% silver and 28% copper that has the lowest melting point of any mixture of these two metals) would be produced, fusing the layers together. Sometimes eutectic was sprinkled between the layers to increase the bond. Exposure of the deception was often due to wear at the high points of the coin, or moisture trapped between the layers that caused the foil to bubble and then break as the core corroded.

A later method for making fourrées involved adding silver to the base metal coin after it had been struck. This method allowed even less silver to be used, which became more important in order to make counterfeiting profitable as the official coinage was debased. The exact method by which these coins were silvered is unclear, although possible methods include dipping the coin in molten silver, brushing the coins with molten silver, or dusting the coin with powdered silver and heating it until the silver melted.

In peripheral regions, even cruder counterfeits might pass: in the Viking-age site in Coppergate, in York, a forgery of an Arab dirham was found, struck as if for Isma'il ibn Achmad (ruling at Samarkand, 903-07/8), of copper covered by a once-silvery wash of tin.

Detection

The easiest way to spot a fourrée is by weight, since a fourrée with a copper core would weigh noticeably less than a solid silver coin due to the lower density of copper. The opposite would be true for a fourrée with a lead core.

Another method to determine whether a coin was plated was listening to the sound produced by dropping the coin onto a hard surface since if the coin was solid silver it would have a distinctive ring. Although this was done by contemporary merchants, it is not recommended that this method be used on ancient coin since the coin could be damaged, especially since over time silver coins can become brittle, if the silver begins to recrystallize.

The most obvious way to detect a plated coin would be if the base metal core was damaged or worn, revealing the base metal. There are often chisel or chop marks on ancient silver coins by merchants attempting to determine if a coin was solid. These "banker marks" are most common on Roman denarii of the 1st century BC and 1st century AD.

During the Crisis of the Third Century, constant wars required a lot of coins to be produced, leading to heavy debasing of precious metal coinage. The antoninianus was eventually debased to the point where flans (blank metal disks) were produced with 5% silver or less, and pickled to dissolve the copper from the surface producing a spongy surface of almost pure silver. When these coins struck, the force of striking would produce a thin shiny layer of silver on the surface, which would quickly wear away. These "silvered" coins are not considered fourrées, since they are not actually plated since the metal is actually a continuous layer and these coins were not created to deceive.

Modern examples
Of modern coins, the clad US quarter dollar is an example of a coin which is not a fourrée, it is made of two layers of copper nickel, with copper sandwich in between and therefore is not a plated coin. The 1982 and later US one cent piece (Lincoln penny) is an example of a fourrée since it is zinc which has been plated with copper.

The Euro 1, 2 and 5-cent coins are copper-coated steel fourrées.

Fourrée is also spelt with and without the accent (é), with one or two r's, and with one or two e's. The Latin term for a silver-plated copper coin is subaeratus and the Greek name is hypochalkos, both meaning "copper below".

Notes

External links

 Aaron Emigh's collection of hundreds of ancient Greek, Roman and Celtic fourrées
 Doug Smith's site
 Reid Goldsborough's site on ancient coin fourrees
 Warren Esty's site featuring hundreds of examples of counterfeits 

Coins of ancient Rome
Money forgery
Counterfeit money